Honka can refer to:

Places
FC Honka, a Finnish football club
"Object Honka", the "club house" in the Mezhyhirya Residence in Ukraine 
Honka Monka, a Long Island City nightclub

People
Anttoni Honka (born 2000), Finnish ice hockey defenceman
Fritz Honka (1935-1998), German serial killer
Hartmut Honka (born 1978), German conservative politician 
Julius Honka (born 1995), Finnish ice hockey player
Juuso Honka (born 1990), Finnish ice hockey player
Ondřej Honka (born 1986), Czech footballer

Other
Honkarakenne, a Finnish company
Tapiolan Honka, a Finnish basketball team
Espoon Honka, the club Tapiolan formed from
2009 FC Honka season
2019 FC Honka season
FC Honka, Finnish women's football team

Disambiguation pages with surname-holder lists